Proserpine (also Proserpina) is an oil painting on canvas by English artist and poet Dante Gabriel Rossetti, painted in 1874 and now in Tate Britain. Rossetti began work on the painting in 1871 and painted at least eight separate versions, the last only completed in 1882, the year of his death. Early versions were promised to Charles Augustus Howell. The painting discussed in this article is the so-called seventh version commissioned by Frederick Richards Leyland, now at the Tate Gallery, with the very similar final version now at the Birmingham Museum and Art Gallery.

History

In his Proserpine, the artist illustrates in his typical Pre-Raphaelite style the Greek goddess Proserpina who lives in the underworld during Winter. Although Rossetti inscribed the date 1874 on the picture, he worked for seven years on eight separate canvases before he finished with it. His Proserpine, like his model Jane Morris, is an exquisitely beautiful woman, with delicate facial features, slender hands, and flawlessly pale skin set off by her thick raven hair. Rossetti painted it at a time when his mental health was extremely precarious and his love for Jane Morris was at its most obsessive.

Rossetti wrote about ProserpineShe is represented in a gloomy corridor of her palace, with the fatal fruit in her hand. As she passes, a gleam strikes on the wall behind her from some inlet suddenly opened, and admitting for a moment the sight of the upper world; and she glances furtively towards it, immersed in thought. The incense-burner stands beside her as the attribute of a goddess. The ivy branch in the background may be taken as a symbol of clinging memory.

Unable to decide as a young man whether to concentrate on painting or poetry, his work is infused with his poetic imagination and an individual interpretation of literary sources. His accompanying sonnet to this work is a poem of longing: "And still some heart unto some soul doth pine," (see sonnet below) carrying an inescapable allusion to his yearning to seduce Jane from her unhappy marriage with William Morris. Proserpine had been imprisoned in Pluto's underground realm for tasting the forbidden pomegranate. Jane, trapped by convention, was also tasting forbidden fruit.
There is a deeper meaning in the painting as Rossetti stayed with Jane at Kelmscott Manor during the summer months each year and in winter she returned to stay with William Morris, thus paralleling Proserpine's freedom during summer.

In Greek and Roman mythology, Proserpine daughter of Ceres, was carried off to the Underworld (Hades) by Pluto, who married her despite her love for Adonis. When Ceres begged Jupiter to return her daughter to Earth, he agreed, on condition that Proserpine had not eaten any fruits in Hades. As Proserpine had eaten six pomegranate seeds, it was decreed that she should remain in Hades for six months of the year and be allowed on Earth for the other six.

The symbolism in Rossetti's painting poignantly indicates Proserpine's plight, as well as Jane Morris's plight, torn between her husband, the father of her two adored daughters, and her lover. The pomegranate draws the viewer's eye, the colour of its flesh matching the colour of Proserpine's full lips. The ivy behind her, as Rossetti stated, represents clinging memory and the passing of time; the shadow on the wall is her time in Hades, the patch of sunlight, her glimpse of earth. Her dress, like spilling water, suggests the turning of the tides, and the incense burner denotes the subject as an immortal. Proserpine's saddened eyes, which are the same cold blue color as most of the painting, indirectly stare at the other realm. Overall, dark hues characterise the colour scheme of the piece.

The inscribed sonnet

On the top right of the canvas "Proserpina" is inscribed by the artist, followed by his sonnet in Italian. The same sonnet in English is inscribed on the frame:Afar away the light that brings cold cheer
Unto this wall, – one instant and no more
Admitted at my distant palace-door
Afar the flowers of Enna from this drear
Dire fruit, which, tasted once, must thrall me here.
Afar those skies from this Tartarean grey
That chills me: and afar how far away,
The nights that shall become the days that were.

Afar from mine own self I seem, and wing
Strange ways in thought, and listen for a sign:
And still some heart unto some soul doth pine,
(Whose sounds mine inner sense in fain to bring,
Continually together murmuring) —
'Woe me for thee, unhappy Proserpine'.
— D. G. Rossetti 

The painting is signed and dated on a scroll at lower left: 'DANTE GABRIELE ROSSETTI RITRASSE NEL CAPODANNO DEL 1874'  (Dante Gabriel Rossetti painted this at the beginning of 1874). The frame, designed by Rossetti, has roundels which resemble a section of a pomegranate, reflecting the sliced pomegranate in Proserpine's hand.

Display

Leyland commissioned eighteen paintings from Rossetti, not counting unfulfilled commissions. Soon after Leyland acquired his first Rossetti painting, he and Rossetti explored the idea of a Rossetti triptych, which was eventually formed with Mnemosyne, The Blessed Damozel, and Proserpine. Three additional Rossetti paintings were then hung in Leyland's drawing room, all of which Leyland called "stunners."

See also
 Proserpina
 English art
 List of paintings by Dante Gabriel Rossetti
 Rossetti and His Circle by Max Beerbohm

References

Sources

Further reading
 Ash, Russell. (1995) Dante Gabriel Rossetti. London: Pavilion Books.
 Doughty, Oswald. (1949) A Victorian Romantic: Dante Gabriel Rossetti  London: Frederick Muller.
 Fredeman, William E. (ed.) (2002–08) The correspondence of Dante Gabriel Rossetti. 7 Vols., Brewer, Cambridge.
 Hilto, Timoth. (1970) The Pre-Raphelites. London: Thames and Hudson, New York: Abrams.
 Parris, Leslie (ed.) (1984) The Pre-Raphaelites, exhibition catalogue, London: Tate Gallery. 
 Surtees, Virginia. (1971) Dante Gabriel Rossetti. 2 vols. Oxford: Clarendon Press.
 Todd, Pamela. (2001) Pre-Raphaelites at Home, New York: Watson-Giptill Publications.
 Treuherz, Julian, Prettejohn, Elizabeth, and Becker, Edwin (2003). Dante Gabriel Rossetti. London: Thames & Hudson.

External links

 Rossetti's Proserpine on the Victorian Web
 Longing and Connection in D.G. Rossetti's Proserpine
 Proserpine and Jane Morris: Women Trapped in Unhappy Relationships
 The Rossetti Archive
 Birmingham Museums and Art Gallery's Pre-Raphaelite Online Resource 
 Proserpine at Tate Britain

Paintings by Dante Gabriel Rossetti
Collection of the Tate galleries
1874 paintings
Paintings of Greek goddesses
Food and drink paintings
Collections of Birmingham Museum and Art Gallery
Proserpina